Kertu is an Estonian feminine given name; an Estonian variant of the given name Gertud.

As of 1 January 2021, 1,268 women in Estonia have the first name Kertu. Kertu is the 144th most popular female name in the country. Kertu is most common in the 15–19 age group, where there are 22.19 per 10,000 inhabitants bearing the name. The name is most commonly found in Lääne County, where  14.10 per 10,000 inhabitants of the county bear the name.

Individuals bearing the name Kertu include:

Kertu Ly Alnek (born 1999), swimmer
Keru Jukum (born 1984), radio and television presenter and broadcast director
Kertu Moppel (born 1985), director and actress
Kertu Saks (born 1971), journalist, science book author
Kertu Sillaste (born 1973), textile artist, illustrator and children's writer
Kertu Tiitso (born 1971), hurdler

References

Feminine given names
Estonian feminine given names